James Edward Willis III (born September 2, 1972) is a former American football linebacker in the National Football League and a former coach in the NCAA and in the NFL. He was drafted by the Green Bay Packers in the fifth round of the 1993 NFL Draft. He played college football at Auburn. He played high school football at J.O. Johnson High School in Huntsville, Alabama. He was the defensive assistant/linebackers coach for the New Orleans Saints of the National Football League until his termination on January 5, 2017.

Willis also played for the Philadelphia Eagles, Seattle Seahawks, and the Birmingham Thunderbolts of the now defunct XFL.

Playing career
Willis was drafted in the 5th round (119th overall) by the Green Bay Packers in the 1993 NFL Draft.

Coaching career
Upon the dissolution of the XFL, Willis decided to retire as a player and returned to Auburn to work towards completing his college degree. He became a student assistant for the Auburn Tigers football team in 2001 and became a defensive graduate assistant in 2003 under defensive coordinator Gene Chizik.

Rhode Island Rams
In 2004, Willis took his first coaching job as the linebackers coach of the Rhode Island Rams.

Temple Owls
In 2005, Willis was hired for the same position by Temple University.

Auburn Tigers
In 2006, Auburn head coach Tommy Tuberville hired Willis to return to his alma mater as the linebackers coach under new defensive coordinator Will Muschamp. When Muschamp left for Texas, his replacement Paul Rhoads kept Willis on staff. When coach Tuberville resigned from Auburn in 2008, the entire staff was initially released by new head coach Gene Chizik, however on December 26, 2008 Willis was retained to again coach linebackers.

Alabama Crimson Tide
Although initially thought to return to Auburn, Willis was hired by Alabama's head coach Nick Saban to be the Crimson Tide's associate head coach and outside linebackers coach on January 21, 2009. During his one season with Alabama, the Crimson Tide defeated the Texas Longhorns in the 2010 BCS National Championship Game.

Texas Tech Red Raiders
On January 13, 2010, Willis agreed to join head coach Tommy Tuberville to serve as the new defensive coordinator for the Texas Tech Red Raiders football team. Prior to the 2011 TicketCity Bowl, Willis allegedly left the program to pursue other career opportunities after a domestic disturbance call at his home.

Louisiana Ragin' Cajuns
On February 7, 2013, Willis agreed to become the new defensive coordinator for the Ragin Cajuns.

New Orleans Saints
On February 11, 2015, it was reported that Willis left the Ragin' Cajuns to become a defensive assistant/linebackers coach for the Saints. He was fired from the Saints on January 5, 2017

Northlake Christian 
In 2019 it was announced that James would be the head football coach at Northlake Christian high school.

References

External links
Auburn Tigers bio 
NFL.com info

1972 births
Living people
African-American coaches of American football
African-American players of American football
American football linebackers
Auburn Tigers football players
Green Bay Packers players
Philadelphia Eagles players
Seattle Seahawks players
Birmingham Thunderbolts players
Rhode Island Rams football coaches
Temple Owls football coaches
Auburn Tigers football coaches
Alabama Crimson Tide football coaches
Texas Tech Red Raiders football coaches
Hartford Colonials coaches
Louisiana Ragin' Cajuns football coaches
Players of American football from Alabama
Sportspeople from Huntsville, Alabama
21st-century African-American sportspeople
20th-century African-American sportspeople